The Women's Flat Track Derby Association Division 2 (WFTDA Division 2) was the second-highest level of play in women's flat track roller derby from 2013 through 2017. Comprising different structures over that time, in early 2018 the Women's Flat Track Derby Association (WFTDA) announced it was replacing the Division 2 Playoffs with geographically-based Continental Cups, the structure and quantity of which is expected to adjust and possibly expand over time.

Organisation
Historically, the WFTDA divided member leagues into four geographical regions: East, North Central, South Central and West. At the start of 2013, these were redivided into three divisions, each operating worldwide. However, foreseeing continued growth in membership, the WFTDA stated that future developments were likely to include new regional structures alongside the divisional system.

For 2013 and 2014, the division consisted of the members of the Women's Flat Track Derby Association who were ranked from 41 to 100. The rankings were set at the start of each year, based on performance over the previous year. Although rankings are updated during the year, teams would only transfer between divisions at the start of each year. Teams in Division 2 played in bouts through the year, aiming to qualify for one of the end-of-year playoff tournaments. Any Division 2 teams which were ranked in the WFTDA's top forty at the end of June each year qualified for the WFTDA Division 1 Playoffs. Those ranked between 41 and 60, which might have included WFTDA Division 3 teams who met sanctioned-game play requirements, qualified for one of the two Division 2 Playoffs.

Starting with 2015, sanctioned-game play requirements were modified to be simply any four WFTDA-sanctioned games played between December 1 of the previous calendar year and June 30, without a requirement to play a certain number of games against similarly-ranked opponents. Teams which did not play a minimum number of sanctioned bouts were not permitted to compete at the Playoffs. Eligible teams ranked 41-60 as of June of the calendar year remained eligible for Division 2 Playoffs. If a team that meets eligibility requirements declines their invitation, the teams ranked next beyond 60 fill available spots so that 20 teams still take part.

Starting with 2017, the system was restructured to place the top 36 teams in the WFTDA in Division 1, with teams ranked 37 through 52 qualifying for a single, 16-team Division 2 Playoff tournament and championship. The 2017 tournament was held in Pittsburgh, Pennsylvania, hosted by Steel City Roller Derby.

2017 member leagues
The 2017 Division 2 member list was announced by the WFTDA on July 14. Two eligible leagues, Sun State Roller Girls of Brisbane, Australia and Sac City Rollers of Sacramento, California both declined, and combined with other higher ranked teams either declining or not meeting eligibility requirements, allowed teams as low as #58 Dublin Roller Derby to participate. As a result, the table below features 18 teams, including the two that declined participating in the Pittsburgh Playoffs and Championship.

Notes

Past members
The initial Division 1 membership list for 2013 was based upon the team's rankings as of June 30, 2012. The 2014 Division 2 membership list was announced on 9 December 2013, based on the overall rankings that took effect as of 30 November 2013. The membership of Division 2 in 2014 mostly comprised teams from the United States, but also three from Canada and two from Scotland. From 2013-14, membership comprised teams ranked 41-100 overall per those year's specified dates.

With Division 2 game play requirements abandoned starting with the 2015 season, membership currently denotes teams that meet gameplay requirements and thus eligibility for that year's Division 2 Playoffs, and includes teams who declined Playoff invitations, along with higher-ranked teams that competed. The 2015 membership list was derived from that year's June 30 rankings. The 2016 Division 2 member list was announced by the WFTDA on July 15 of that year. Two eligible leagues, Auld Reekie Roller Girls of Edinburgh and Paradise City Roller Derby of Gold Coast, Australia both declined, allowing #61 Grand Raggidy Roller Girls and #62 Carolina Rollergirls to take part.

Notes

Playoff tournaments

2013
Both of the 2013 Playoff tournaments were played in the United States.

2013 Championship

2014
The first 2014 Playoff tournament was held in Duluth, Minnesota, and the second was held in Kitchener-Waterloo, Ontario, Canada, the first WFTDA Playoff tournament to be held outside the United States. At Kitchener-Waterloo, the Rideau Valley Roller Girls from Ottawa, Ontario became the first non-American team to win a WFTDA playoff tournament.

2014 Championship

2015
Both 2015 Playoffs were held in the United States.

2015 Championship

2016
Both 2016 Playoffs were again held in the United States.

2016 Championship

2017
Playoffs and Championship
In 2017, the Playoffs were combined into a single two-track tournament in Pittsburgh, Pennsylvania, with the Division 2 championship awarded at its conclusion.

References

 
Sports leagues established in 2013
Women's Flat Track Derby Association